On 28 June 2018, at about 1:15 pm, a Beechcraft C90 King Air aircraft chartered from UY Aviation Pvt Ltd with the registration VT-UPZ crashed at Jagruti Nagar in the suburb of Ghatkopar in Mumbai, India. The 12-seater aircraft carried 4 people, including the pilot. All people on board plus one person on the ground were killed. A further three people on the ground were seriously injured. 

As a result of the crash, a fire broke out in the built-up area. Local firefighters and police responded to the accident.

The aircraft had departed from Juhu Aerodrome for a test flight. Five people lost their lives in this accident; 2 pilots, 1 Technician, 1 Aircraft Maintenance Engineer, and 1 civilian.

Investigation
The Aircraft Accident Investigation Bureau, India released the final investigation report in Dec 2018. The probable cause of the accident as per the report was a stall caused by lack of situational awareness due to spatial disorientation triggered by deteriorating weather, a transition from ILS (IMC) to visual flying (Partial VMC) and unexpected bank owing to differential engine power. 

The aircraft VT-UPZ was previously owned by the Uttar Pradesh government. In 2014, the aircraft had an accident in Allahabad in which there was minor damage as per DGCA investigation report. Over the next decade, the aircraft changed ownership and was transported to Mumbai where the repair work was carried out with approval from DGCA.

References

2018 disasters in India
2010s in Mumbai
Aviation accidents and incidents in 2018
Accidents and incidents involving the Beechcraft King Air
Transport in Mumbai
Aviation accidents and incidents in India
June 2018 events in India
Aviation accidents and incidents caused by pilot error